The 2017–18 Guinée Championnat National season is the 52nd edition (since independence) of the top level of football competition in Guinea. It began on 3 November 2017 and ended on 7 June 2018.

Standings

See also
2018 Guinée Coupe Nationale

References

Guinée Championnat National
Championnat National
Championnat National
Gui